Vishwanath Sharma (19 October 1939 - 20 November 2017) was an Indian politician.  He was elected to the Lok Sabha, the lower house of the Parliament of India from Jhansi in 1980 and Hamirpur  in 1991.

References

External links
 Official Biographical Sketch in Lok Sabha Website

Indian National Congress politicians
1939 births
2017 deaths
India MPs 1991–1996
India MPs 1980–1984
Lok Sabha members from Uttar Pradesh